This is a list of notable events in the history of LGBT rights that took place in the year 1986.

Events
 In New Zealand, the Homosexual Law Reform Act equalizes the age of consent for homosexual acts to 16, the legal age for heterosexual acts. The law was signed by the governor-general July 11, and came into effect August 8.
 Davis, California, prohibits employment discrimination based on sexual orientation in the private sector.
 Sacramento, California, prohibits employment discrimination based on sexual orientation in the private sector.

March
 20 — New York City passes its first anti-discrimination bill.

June
 30 — The Supreme Court of the United States upholds the constitutionality of the Georgia state sodomy law in Bowers v. Hardwick.

July
 7 — The United States Supreme Court denies certiorari in the case of Baker v. Wade, a constitutional challenge to the sodomy law of Texas.

October
 22 — In the battle against AIDS, Surgeon General of the United States C. Everett Koop, publishes the first government publications for the public on gay safer sex practices.

December
 11 — Austin, Texas, passes an ordinance that prohibits discrimination against people with HIV or AIDS.

Deaths
 December 28 — Terry Dolan, U.S. activist against gay rights and closeted gay man, dies at 36 from an AIDS-related illness.

See also

Timeline of LGBT history — timeline of events from 12,000 BCE to present
LGBT rights by country or territory — current legal status around the world
LGBT social movements

Notes

References
 Murdoch, Joyce and Deb Price (2001). Courting Justice: Gay Men and Lesbians v. the Supreme Court. New York, Basic Books, a member of the Perseus Books Group. .

LGBT rights by year
LGBT rights